Georgios is a Greek name derived from the word georgos ("farmer" lit. "earth-worker"). The word georgos is a compound of ge ("earth", "soil") and ergon ("task", "undertaking", "work"). 

It is one of the most usual given names in Greece and Cyprus.
The name day is 23 April (St George's Day).
 
The English form of the name is George, the latinized form is Georgius. It was rarely given in England prior to the accession of George I of Great Britain in 1714.
The Greek name is usually anglicized as George.
For example, the name of Georgios Kuprios is anglicized as George of Cyprus, and latinized as Georgius Cyprius;
similarly George Hamartolos (d. 867), George Maniakes (d. 1043), George Palaiologos (d. 1118).

In the case of modern Greek individuals, the spelling Georgios may be retained, e.g. 
Georgios Christakis-Zografos (1863–1920), 
Georgios Stanotas (1888–1965),
Georgios Grivas (1897–1974),
Georgios Alogoskoufis (b. 1955), 
Georgios Alexopoulos (b. 1977), etc.

The modern Greek short form Γιώργος Giorgos is sometimes rendered Yiorgos or Yorgos, as in Yiorgos Theotokas (1906–1966).

See also 

George (given name)
Georgio
Giorgos

Georgios Karaiskakis (municipality)
Georgios Kamaras Stadium

References 

Greek masculine given names